Laughing Irish Eyes is a 1936 American comedy film directed by Joseph Santley and written by Olive Cooper, Ben Ryan and Stanley Rauh. The film stars Phil Regan, Walter C. Kelly, Evalyn Knapp, Ray Walker, Mary Gordon and Warren Hymer. The film was released on March 4, 1936, by Republic Pictures.

Plot

Cast

Phil Regan as Danny O'Keefe
Walter C. Kelly as Pat Kelly
Evalyn Knapp as Peggy Kelly
Ray Walker as Eddie Bell
Mary Gordon as Mrs. O'Keefe
Warren Hymer as Tiger O'Keefe
Betty Compson as Molly
J. M. Kerrigan as Tim
Herman Bing as Weisbecher
Raymond Hatton as Gallagher
Clarence Muse as Deacon
Russell Hicks as Silk Taylor
Maurice Black as Tony Martin
John Sheehan as Joe Cronin
Robert Homans as Announcer
John Indrisano as Fight Trainer
Ritchie McCarron as Dynamite O'Reilly
Jimmy O'Gatty as Killer O'Kearny
Don La Rue as Kid Campo
Charles Randolph as Referee
Raymond Brown as Editor

References

External links
 

1936 films
1930s English-language films
American comedy films
1936 comedy films
Republic Pictures films
Films directed by Joseph Santley
American black-and-white films
Films produced by Nat Levine
1930s American films